OPJS University is a State University located in Churu District of Rajasthan, India. It is accredited by University Grants Commission U/S 2 of 1956. University offers  courses in the fields of engineering, pharmacy, law, business education, and agriculture.

History 
According to OPJS University's trust before making the University it was started as a Primary school and the school Arya Pathshala established 1922 by late Shri Sanwaliaram. After India Independence and demise of Sanwaliaram his son, Om Parkash made a school trust board. At last  Om Parkash's son, Jogender Singh found the University. After giving permission by University Grants Commission (India), the founder kept the university name his won name and his father's name, Om Parkash Jogender Singh University. The University simply better is known as OPJS University.

Accreditation 
UGC (University Grants Commission)
AICTE (All India Council for Technical Education)
NCTE (National Council for Teacher Education)
BCI (Bar Council of India)
PCI (Pharmacy Council of India)
COA (Council of Architecture)
Government of Rajasthan

References

External links

Private universities in India
Universities in Rajasthan
Churu district
Educational institutions established in 2013
2013 establishments in Rajasthan